Zahir Hussein Khan (born 4 October 1960) is a former Pakistani professional squash player.

Zahir Hussein Khan was born on 4 October 1960 and moved to West Germany in order to compete on the European circuit. He represented Pakistan during the 1979 World Team Squash Championships.

References

External links
 

Pakistani male squash players
1960 births
Living people
Place of birth missing (living people)